Liu Tao (Chinese: 刘涛; Pinyin: Liú Tāo; born 22 January 1985) is a Chinese football player who currently plays for Chengdu Better City.

Club career
Liu started his professional football career in 2006 when he was promoted into China League One side Jiangsu Sainty first team. He would eventually make his league debut for Jiangsu on 24 October 2009 in a game against Shandong Luneng Taishan.
In March 2011, he made a free transfer to Tianjin Songjiang and signed a 2-year-contract with the club. 
Liu joined Guangdong Sunray Cave along with his teammate Wang Qiang in January 2013.

On 16 February 2015, Liu transferred to China League Two side Dalian Transcendence.
On 23 January 2017, Liu moved to League Two side Shenzhen Ledman.
In March 2018, Liu transferred to his hometown club Suzhou Dongwu in the China League Two.
On 27 February 2019, Liu transferred to League Two newcomer Chengdu Better City. He would go on to win promotion with the club as they came runners-up at the end of the 2019 China League Two season. He would be a vital part of the team as the club gained promotion to the top tier at the end of the 2021 league campaign.

Personal life
Liu married former China women's national football team midfielder Song Xiaoli on 5 November 2011.

Career statistics 
Statistics accurate as of match played 8 January 2023.

Honours

Club
Jiangsu Sainty
China League One: 2008

References

External links
 

1985 births
Living people
Chinese footballers
Footballers from Jiangsu
Sportspeople from Suzhou
Jiangsu F.C. players
Tianjin Tianhai F.C. players
Guangdong Sunray Cave players
Dalian Transcendence F.C. players
Suzhou Dongwu F.C. players
Chengdu Better City F.C. players
Chinese Super League players
China League One players
China League Two players
Association football defenders